Search Party is an American dark comedy television created by Sarah-Violet Bliss, Charles Rogers, and Michael Showalter. Primarily set in New York City, the series follows a group of friends who become involved in the search for a missing young woman and the events that result from their involvement.

The series premiered on TBS on November 21, 2016. After being renewed for a third season in 2018, it was announced the series would be moving to WarnerMedia's HBO Max streaming service. The fourth season premiered on January 14, 2021 and a fifth and final season premiered on January 7, 2022.

Outside of the US, the BBC bought the UK rights to Search Party, with the entire series dropping on its streaming platform BBC iPlayer from New Year's Day 2023.

Plot
Search Party depicts the lives of New York City resident Dory Sief, her passive boyfriend Drew Gardner, flamboyant show-off Elliott Goss, and flighty actress Portia Davenport. Serving as a contrast to the group is Dory's ex-boyfriend Julian Marcus, a journalist whose blunt nature frequently puts him into conflict with others.

The first season focuses on the disappearance of Dory's college acquaintance Chantal Witherbottom, whom Dory sets out to find, with Drew, Elliott, and Portia reluctantly joining her investigation. While her friends also deal with difficulties in their own lives, Dory focuses on her pursuit of Chantal, believing her to be in danger.

The second season focuses on the death of Keith Powell, a private investigator who was killed by Dory at the end of the first season. As the group struggles to return to their normal lives, they also attempt to cover up Keith's death, which affects them in various ways.

The third season focuses on Dory and Drew being tried for murdering Keith, which Dory denies any involvement in, forcing them to battle against the evidence suggesting they caused his death. A media circus soon circles around the trial, while the friends have their relationships tested and Dory's sanity gradually deteriorates.

The fourth season focuses on Dory's abduction at the hands of Chip Wreck, a psychotic man unhealthily obsessed with her. The abduction sends Drew, Elliott, and Portia searching for Dory as Chip attempts to manipulate Dory against her friends.

The fifth season follows Dory's transformation into a cult leader. Supported by a Big Tech Pharma company and flanked by a group of social media influencer disciples, Dory and her friends attempt to achieve a transcendent state of enlightenment.

Cast and characters

Main
 Alia Shawkat as Dory Sief
 John Reynolds as Drew Gardner
 John Early as Elliott Goss
 Meredith Hagner as Portia Davenport
 Brandon Micheal Hall as Julian Marcus (seasons 1–2; guest seasons 3–4)

Recurring
 Clare McNulty as Chantal Witherbottom
 Jeffery Self as Marc, Elliott's on and off boyfriend
 Ron Livingston as Keith Powell (seasons 1-4)
 Bonnie Milligan as Katherine Witherbottom, Chantal's sister
 Connor Ratliff as Ted, Chantal's sister Katherine's fiancé
 Catherine Lloyd Burns as Linda Witherbottom, Chantal's mom
 Christine Taylor as Gail, Dory's wealthy boss
 Phoebe Tyers as April, Dory and Drew's neighbor (seasons 1-4)
 Claire Tyers as June, April's twin sister (seasons 2–3)
 Tymberlee Hill as Joy Hartman, a police detective (seasons 2–3)
 Jennifer Kim as Agnes Cho (seasons 1–2)
 Christine Ebersole as Mariel Davenport, Portia's mother (seasons 1–2, 4)
 Rosie Perez as Lorraine De Coss (season 1)
 Parker Posey as Brick (season 1)
 Michael Showalter as Max (seasons 1–2)
 Kate Berlant as Nia Carpourtalas, Elliott's editor (seasons 1–2, 4)
 J. Smith-Cameron as Mary Ferguson (seasons 2–3)
 Judy Reyes as Deb, Keith's ex-wife (seasons 2–3)
 Jay Duplass as Elijah (seasons 2–3)
 Griffin Newman as Gavin, Chantal's ex-boyfriend (seasons 1, 5)
 Michaela Watkins as Polly Danzinger, a prosecutor in Drew's and Dory's murder trial (season 3)
 Shalita Grant as Cassidy Diamond, Dory's rookie defense attorney (season 3)
 Louie Anderson as Bob Lunch, Drew's defense attorney (season 3)
 Chloe Fineman as Charlie Reeny, Elliot's co-worker (seasons 3–4)
 Cole Escola as Chip Wreck, Dory's stalker (seasons 3–4)
 Jim Santangeli as Garrett (season 3)
 Kathy Griffin as Liquorice Montague (season 5)
 Jeff Goldblum as Tunnel Quinn, a billionaire tech mogul (season 5)
 Larry Owens as Ritchie, an influencer and Dory's follower (season 5)
 Angela Trimbur as Elodie, an influencer and Dory's follower (season 5)
 Greta Titelman as Leonore, an influencer and Dory's follower (season 5)
 Michelle Badillo as Winnie, an influencer and Dory's follower (season 5)
 Grace Kuhlenschmidt as Pepper, an influencer and Dory's follower (season 5)
 Joe Castle Baker as Marty, an influencer and Dory's follower (season 5)
 Aparna Nancherla as Benny Balthazar, a doctor working in the Lyte pill's formula (season 5)

Guest stars
 Judy Gold as Paulette Capuzzi (season 1)
 Alysia Reiner as Trina, the main star of the crime drama Portia is a series regular in (season 1)
 Tunde Adebimpe as Edwin (season 1)
 Sunita Mani as Pia (season 1)
 Jo Firestone as Carla, rehab patient (season 2) 
 Chelsea Peretti as Patsy Monahan (season 3)
 Wallace Shawn as William Badpastor (season 3)
 Annette O'Toole as Diana Fontaine (season 3)
 Ann Dowd as Paula Jo Bridgewater (season 4)
 Susan Sarandon as Lylah (season 4)
 Christopher McDonald as Bill (season 4)
 Griffin Dunne as Richard Wreck (season 4)
 Deborah Rush as Gertrude (season 4)
 Busy Philipps as Donna DiMarco (season 4)
 R. L. Stine as himself (season 4)
 Lillias White as Wilma (season 4)
 John Waters as Sheffield (season 5)
 Rosemary Harris as Beatrice Hamsdale (season 5)
 Julio Torres as Quique (season 5)

Episodes

Season 1 (2016)

Season 2 (2017)

Season 3 (2020)

Season 4 (2021)

Season 5 (2022)

Production
In June 2015, it was announced Alia Shawkat, John Early, John Reynolds, and Meredith Hagner had all been cast in the pilot, with Sarah-Violet Bliss and Charles Rogers directing and writing alongside Michael Showalter, Lilly Burns, Tony Hernandez, John Skidmore, Brittany Segal serving as executive producers and producers respectively. In November 2015, TBS ordered the series. and the second season premiered on November 19, 2017. In April 2018, a third season was ordered, however in October 2019 it was announced the series would move to HBO Max, where the third season would premiere at the service's Spring 2020 launch. A fourth season was also ordered, which premiered in 2021. On February 9, 2021, HBO Max renewed the series for a fifth season. On November 9, 2021, the fifth season was given a premiere date of January 7, 2022, revealed to be its last.

Filming
The shooting of the first season began in the summer of 2015 in New York. For the filming of the second season the production returned to New York. Filming for season 3 began in September 2018 and wrapped that November. Production on Season 4 began in December 2019 and wrapped in late February 2020.

Themes 
While the show is a dark comedy, Search Party has undergone various shifts of tone and genres in each season. The first season is a mystery, revolving around the disappearance of Chantal Witherbottom and the story nods to classic detective stories such as Nancy Drew Mystery Stories, as underlined by the promotional art designed by Sam Hadley. It also includes comedy-drama elements, since the mystery plot is echoed by Dory's search for meaning and purpose. The creator Charles Rogers stated that the show explores "what it means to be "a good person"" and "the difference between wanting to be seen as a good person and being an actual one". The first three seasons also have a running theme around the toxic nature of deception, both deceiving others and self-deception. Télérama labeled the first series as an existential quest. According to Charles Rogers, the title highlights this multiplicity:We wanted a title that conveys this blend of comedy and drama, but all our propositions were incongruous or far-fetched. Until we figured out that the most simple phrase used to talk about organized searches when a person's missing, "search party", was perfect : "search" represents mystery and "party" is the fun part. The heroes of the show don't really know what they're doing. For them, it's a light and entertaining thing. They shouldn't get involved in such detective work...The second season features psychological thriller elements, as underlined by the Alfred Hitchcock-inspired promotional art. Alia Shawkat asserted that the main theme of the season is "Hitchcock's paranoia".

Dory and Drew's trial in the third series introduces a "courtroom drama" narrative, influenced by the works of John Grisham. Charles Rogers stated that the legal plot was inspired by the real-life trial of Amanda Knox, who was convicted of murder in 2007. Moreover, the satire is mostly focused on fame and the media, with Rogers referencing the satirical crime film The Bling Ring and the cult dark comedy film To Die For, whose postmodern style is echoed throughout the season thanks to the inclusion of fictional true-crime shows and interviews of the main characters.

The fourth season was described by Sarah-Violet Bliss as "being the kind of 'captive' genre" and drew comparisons to Misery.

Critics described the fifth season as surreal science fiction and zombie horror.

Reception

The first season received positive reviews from television critics. Los Angeles Times wrote that it was "tightly made and effective on multiple levels". GQ wrote that it is "a flawless oddity, a once-in-a-lifetime piece of art. It's not the weekend's best show, it's the year's best." It holds a 100% approval rating on Rotten Tomatoes. The site's critical consensus reads "Search Party is an engaging, weird, dark, funny mystery elevated by exceptional performances throughout." On Metacritic, the season holds a rating of 81 out of 100, indicating "universal acclaim".

The second season of Search Party received positive reviews from television critics. It holds a 96% approval rating on Rotten Tomatoes. The site's critical consensus reads "With a never-better Alia Shawkat in the lead, Search Party'''s second season delves deeper into the deliciously dark dramedy that makes the show so addictively entertaining." On Metacritic, the season holds a rating of 78 out of 100, indicating "generally favorable reviews".

The third season of Search Party received positive reviews from television critics. It holds a 93% approval rating on Rotten Tomatoes. The site's critical consensus reads "Search Party'''s third season changes the satirical scenery without losing any of its bite, while giving its capable cast plenty of moments to shine." On Metacritic, the season holds a rating of 78 out of 100, indicating "generally favorable reviews".

Accolades

References

External links
 Search Party on HBO Max
 
 Official screenplay of the season 3 finale

2016 American television series debuts
2022 American television series endings
2010s American black comedy television series
2020s American black comedy television series
2010s American single-camera sitcoms
2020s American single-camera sitcoms
English-language television shows
TBS (American TV channel) original programming
HBO Max original programming
Television series about missing people
Television series by Studio T
Television shows set in New York City